Marianna Barelli (born 15 July 1976) is an Italian rower. She competed in the women's double sculls event at the 1996 Summer Olympics.

References

1976 births
Living people
Italian female rowers
Olympic rowers of Italy
Rowers at the 1996 Summer Olympics
Sportspeople from Como